The Kang Hou gui is a bronze vessel that is said to have been found near the city of Huixian, Henan province, central China. Dating to the Western Zhou period, this ancient Chinese artefact is famous for its inscription on the bottom of the interior. It has been part of the British Museum's Asian Collections since 1977.

Provenance
Little is known about the original context in which the bowl was found. However, based on its inscription, it is conjectured by archaeologists to have been deposited in Wey, near present-day Huixian in Henan province. Past owners of the vessel include the British diplomat Dugald Malcolm, before the gui was purchased by the British Museum with the support of the Brooke Sewell bequest.

Description
This cast bronze gui is a lavishly decorated food bowl that was used during rituals for worshipping ancestors. This high based vessel has large handles shaped like tusked animal heads that have eaten birds, whose beaks are shown peeking out of their predators' mouths. Between the rim and the incised vertical lines is a narrow band decorated with an animal head and alternating roundels and quatrefoils. A similar band (without the animal heads) is engraved on the foot of the container.  The Kang Hou gui was chosen by Neil MacGregor, the Director of the British Museum, as object 23 in the BBC Radio programme A History of the World in 100 Objects.

Inscription
The ancient Chinese inscription on the inside of the bowl tells how King Wu's brother, Kang Hou (Marquis of Kang) was given territory in Wey. The inscription also describes a rebellion by remnants of the Shang dynasty, known as the Rebellion of the Three Guards, and its defeat by the Zhou dynasty, which helps to date the vessel. Because historians know when this unsuccessful rebellion against the Zhou took place, they are able to accurately date the manufacture of this important object to the 11th century BC.

See also
Huixian Bronze Hu, also in the British Museum

Gallery

References

Further reading
J Rawson, The British Museum Book of Chinese Art (London, British Museum Press, 2007)
J. Rawson, Chinese bronzes: art and ritual (London, The British Museum Press, 1987)

Asian objects in the British Museum
Zhou dynasty bronzeware
Wey (state)
Huixian